Mariam Ansari is a Pakistani actress. She was born on 1 March 1997 and raised in Saudi Arabia, Ansari moved to Pakistan when she was nine.

Personal life
Ansari is married to Owais Khan, who is a son of former cricket captain Moin Khan.

Her brother Ali Ansari is also an actor while her brother-in-law Azam Khan is a cricketer.

Filmography

Theatre
Cinderjutt (2013)

Film
Ishq 2020 (2015)
Halla Gulla (2015)
Maalik (2016)
Azaadi (2018)

Television

References

External links
Mariam Ansari on IMDB

Living people
1997 births
21st-century Pakistani actresses
Pakistani television actresses